Cymindis sewertzowi is a species of ground beetle in the subfamily Harpalinae. It was described by Tschitscherine in 1896.

References

sewertzowi
Beetles described in 1896